Daniel Brändle (born 23 January 1992) is a Liechtensteiner international footballer who plays for SV Pullach, as a midfielder.

Career
Born in Vaduz, Brändle has played for FC Balzers, FC Bern 1894, FC Münsingen and St. Andrews.

He made his senior international debut for Liechtenstein in 2014.

References

1992 births
Living people
Liechtenstein footballers
Liechtenstein international footballers
FC Balzers players
FC Bern players
Association football midfielders
St. Andrews F.C. players
FC Münsingen players